{{Infobox sportsperson
| headercolor    = 
| name           = Belal Mansoor Ali
| image          = WAF 2007 1500m Belal Mansoor Ali.jpg
| imagesize      = 150px
| caption        = 
| birth_name     = John Kipkorir Yego
| nationality    = 
| residence      = 
| birth_date     = 
| birth_place    = Kenya
| death_date     = 
| death_place    = 
| height         = 5'7'
| weight         = 58 kg
| website        = 
| country        = 
| sport          = Track and field
| event          = 800 metres, 1500 metres
| collegeteam    = 
| club           = Belal athletics Club
| team           = Gianni demadona 
| turnedpro      = 
| pb             = 800 m: 1:44.02 (Rieti 2007)1000m2:15.23 (Stockholm)1500 m: 3:31.49 (Athens 2007)
| medaltemplates = 

| show-medals    = yes
}}Belal Mansoor Ali (born 17 October 1988) is a middle distance runner now representing Bahrain after changing nationality from Kenya.

He was born John Yego''' on 17 October 1988 in Kenya. Works with Bahrain Defence Forced. A lot of controversy has surrounded his age, starting when he won the 1500 metres race at the 2005 IAAF World Youth Championships in Marrakech, Morocco and became suspected for age cheating. In August 2005 the IAAF opened an investigation regarding Belal Mansoor Ali, Tareq Mubarak Taher and Aadam Ismaeel Khamis, all Bahraini athletes born in Kenya.

The same month Ali was competed at the 2005 World Championships. His most successful event was the 800 metres, where he placed seventh in the final. In June he had set a personal best time over 800 metres of 1:44.34 minutes in Conegliano, Italy; at the time, that was a world youth best, equivalent with the World Record for under age 18.

In July 2006 Ali was arrested in Kenya, suspected for age cheating at the 2005 World Youth Championships. The IAAF Council, gathered in Beijing while the 2006 World Junior Championships took place, reported the slow progression of the case. A few days before, Ali had actually won a World Junior bronze medal over 1500 metres and finished seventh over 800 metres on the track. In late 2006 Ali was cleared of all charges, and in December he won a silver medal at the 2006 Asian Games. In November 2010 he won the bronze medal at the Asian Games.

References

External links
 

1988 births
Living people
Bahraini male middle-distance runners
Kenyan male middle-distance runners
Kenyan emigrants to Bahrain
Olympic athletes of Bahrain
Athletes (track and field) at the 2008 Summer Olympics
Athletes (track and field) at the 2012 Summer Olympics
Asian Games medalists in athletics (track and field)
Naturalized citizens of Bahrain
Athletes (track and field) at the 2006 Asian Games
Athletes (track and field) at the 2010 Asian Games
Bahraini people of Kenyan descent
Asian Games silver medalists for Bahrain
Asian Games bronze medalists for Bahrain
Medalists at the 2006 Asian Games
Medalists at the 2010 Asian Games